Jefferson is an unincorporated community in Park County, Colorado, United States.

Description

The community consists largely of a strip of retail businesses along US 285, as well as a small unpaved grid of houses and trailers on the south side of the highway. The most notable landmarks in the community are a historic one-room schoolhouse and the Historic Jefferson Denver, South Park and Pacific Railroad (DSP&P RR)Depot (c. 1880), highly visible in the surrounding grasslands of South Park. The Jefferson Post Office has the ZIP Code 80456. However, the post office closed in 2022.

Geography
Jefferson is located at  (39.568,-105.801).

See also

References

External links

Unincorporated communities in Park County, Colorado
Unincorporated communities in Colorado